Henry Cemetery is a historic cemetery located near Reger, Sullivan County, Missouri.  The cemetery was founded in 1841 and contains approximately 200 graves dated prior to 1955.  It contains a variety of grave markers from simple limestone slabs with hand carved names to more elaborate Victorian-era stones.  The cemetery remains in use.

It was listed on the National Register of Historic Places in 2005.

References

External links
 
 

Cemeteries on the National Register of Historic Places in Missouri
1841 establishments in Missouri
Buildings and structures in Sullivan County, Missouri
National Register of Historic Places in Sullivan County, Missouri